The Museum der bildenden Künste (German: "Museum of Fine Arts") is a museum in Leipzig, Saxony, Germany. It covers artworks from the Late Middle Ages to Modernity.

History

Museum Foundation and First Museum 

The museum dates back to the founding of the "Leipzig Art Association" by Leipzig art collectors and promoters in 1837, and had set itself the goal of creating an art museum. On 10 December 1848, the association was able to open the "Städtische Museum" in the first public school on the Moritzbastei. There were issued approximately hundred gathered and donated works of (at that time) contemporary art.

Through major donations including Maximilian Speck von Sternburg, Alfred Thieme and Adolf Heinrich Schletter the collection grew with time. In 1853, businessman and art collector Adolf Fer donated his collection under the condition that the city build a municipal museum within five years. Shortly before the deadline expired the museum was inaugurated on 18 December 1858. It was located on the Augustusplatz and was designed by Ludwig Lange in the style of the Italian Renaissance. Today, the Gewandhaus is located at its location. From 1880 to 1886 the building had been for the ever-growing collection extended by Hugo Licht. At the beginning of the 20th century, Fritz von Harck donated a part of his collection to the museum.

In 1937 the Nazis confiscated 394 paintings and prints mainly of Expressionism in the propaganda campaign Degenerate art. In the night of 4 December 1943, the building was destroyed by a British air raid. Much of the inventory had previously been brought to safety.

Dimitroff Museum and Interim Solutions 

After the destruction of the building on Augustusplatz, the museum began a 61-year odyssey through several interim arrangements. After it was taken in 1948 in areas of the former Reichsbank in Petersstraße, it moved in 1952 into the building of the former Reichsgericht.

After the decision on the relocation of the Federal Administrative Court in Leipzig in May 1992, the museum had to move again in August 1997 into an interim site in Handelshof. The collection was shown in limited form at the interim sites.

New building 
In the mid-1990s, the city decided to give the museum back its own building. On 4 December 2004, exactly 61 years after the destruction of the "Städtischen Museum" on Augustusplatz, the new museum opened at the former Sachsenplatz (Saxony Square). The rectangular museum building cost 74.5 million euros. Architects Hufnagel Pütz Rafaelian won the 1997 Europe-wide competition for the new museum. They designed a compact building mass framed by angled structures in the corners of the pre-war street block. It took 15 years until these 4 structures has been built. Today, the 34 meters high museum rises inside a court with outlets at every of the 4 sides and towers above those structures along the streets.

The Museum of Fine Arts was included in the Blue Book, published in 2001, which includes a list of nationally important cultural institutions in eastern Germany and comprises currently 20 so-called cultural lighthouses. As such, it is a member of the Konferenz Nationaler Kultureinrichtungen. The Blue Book aims to highlight the importance of East German cultural heritage for the cultural heritage of Germany and Europe.

Collection 

Today's collection includes approximately 3,500 paintings, 1,000 sculptures and 60,000 graphic sheets. It includes works from the Late Middle Ages to the present, focusing on Old German and Early Netherlandish art of the 15th and 16th century, Italian art from the 15th to 18th century, Dutch art of the 17th century, French art of the 19th and German art from the 18th to 20th century.

Important parts of the collection are works by Dutch and German Old Masters like Frans Hals and Lucas Cranach the Elder, Romantics like Caspar David Friedrich, and representatives of the Düsseldorf school of painting such as Andreas Achenbach. The highlight of the sculpture collection presents the Beethoven sculpture by Max Klinger. For the comprehensive work of Max Klinger and Max Beckmann a separate floor is devoted.

In the field of Modern Art, the museum is primarily to closed factory look of the Leipzig School by artists such as Werner Tübke, Bernhard Heisig, and Wolfgang Mattheuer or larger stocks of the international currently very popular artists Neo Rauch and Daniel Richter.

However, large vacancies in this division of this international field are present. These resulted historically from the GDR period and due to the tight financial situation of the city (the purchase of the museum's budget for 2005 amounted to only 75,000 euros) and can not easily made up. The museum tries to address this problem by experimenting with unusual combinations of works from different eras, which aims to provide visitors with new perspectives.

In the future the museum will be dependent on the expansion of its inventory from donations and permanent loans. The 19th-century tradition began with generous foundations, which itself led only to the founding of the museum, and therefore sits down even in the 21st century. On the occasion of the opening of the new museum building, in 2004 the art collector couple Dr. Hans-Peter Bühler and Marion Buehler-Brockhaus donated 41 works by French artists, including Jean-Baptiste Corot, Charles-François Daubigny, Jean-François Millet, Eugène Delacroix, Edgar Degas and Claude Monet. This shows the development of the art of the 19th century by the Barbizon School to Impressionism. Recently, the museum received from the BMW, which is culturally engaged since the new Leipzig plant in the city, the photo collection "AutoWerke" (Car Works). For the greatest benefactors a mosaic is dedicated as a token of gift and is on display in the foyer.

See also
 Isle of the Dead, painting by Arnold Böcklin, 1886 version
 List of art museums
 List of museums in Germany

References

Literature
 Leipziger Volkszeitung Journal, Sonderbeilage zur Eröffnung des neuen Bildermuseums vom 3. Dezember 2004.
 Bode, Peter M.: Das Haus der tausend Räume, in: Art-Magazin 12/2004, S. 19–31.

External links

  

Art museums and galleries in Germany
Museums in Leipzig
Art museums established in 1848
1848 establishments in Germany
Buildings and structures in Germany destroyed during World War II